Eva Buurman (born 7 September 1994) is a Dutch professional racing cyclist, who currently rides for UCI Women's WorldTeam . Before turning to professional cycling, Buurman was a speed skater.

Major results

2015
 6th Erondegemse Pijl
 9th Parel van de Veluwe
2017
 3rd Trofee Maarten Wynants
 5th Diamond Tour 
 6th Grand Prix de Plumelec-Morbihan Dames
 7th La Classique Morbihan
 7th Erondegemse Pijl
2018
 7th Overall Ladies Tour of Norway
 8th Overall The Women's Tour

See also
 List of 2016 UCI Women's Teams and riders

References

External links
 
 

1994 births
Living people
Dutch female cyclists
People from Wervershoof
Cyclists from North Holland
20th-century Dutch women
21st-century Dutch women